Ballyknockan or Ballynockan is a village and townland in County Wicklow, Ireland. 

Ballyknockan is situated on the western edge of a large granite band extending from Dublin Bay to County Carlow and was known for the granite quarries that existed since the early 19th century. According to an Ordnance survey of 1838, at the time almost half of the population of 400 were employed in the quarries. 

Ballyknockan village is located 220 metres above sea level and is around 25 miles from Dublin City Centre. In 1940 the village of Balinahown was completely flooded and parts of the surrounding towns of Valleymount and Lacken were also flooded to make way for the Poulaphouca Reservoir which spans out over 20 km2 across the land. 

Since then, the village overlooks the reservoir that provides water to thousands of Dublin homes and creates electricity, while also offering many water pursuits such as fishing, sailing, windsurfing, boating, and leisure cruising and canoeing. 

Ballyknockan hosts the Ballyknockan Music Festival "KnockanStockan", annually each summer.

See also
 List of towns and villages in Ireland
 Glyder (band)

Further reading
 Wicklow History & Society by Ken Hannigan & William Nolan 1994, www.tourireland.com/Ballyknockan

References

Towns and villages in County Wicklow